Sarat Kumar Kar (5 September 1939 – 12 October 2020) was a politician and writer from Odisha, India. He was a member of the Biju Janata Dal (BJD) political party.

Biography
He was a member of the 6th Lok Sabha (1977–80) and was elected three times (2000–04, 1990–95 and 1971–74) to the Odisha Legislative Assembly from Mahanga.
Kar became the Minister for Education and Culture in 1971 in the Bishwanath Das led coalition Government. He was probably the youngest Cabinet Minister in Odisha's political history and the record remains intact till today. He was elected as a Janata Party (Lok Dal) MP in 1977 from Cuttack after defeating Congress stalwart and the then sitting Union Minister, Shri J.B.Patnaik.
He was the speaker of the Twelfth Assembly from 10 March 2000 to 21 May 2004.
 
He joined politics in 1964 after completing his master's degree in Political Science from the prestigious Allahabad University. During his Allahabad University days, he had the opportunity to interact with Shri Lal Bahadur Shastri who inspired him to join politics. Shri Kar participated in the political meetings of Shri Shastri and became a member of the AICC. Shri Shastri asked him to meet Shri Biju Patnaik after returning to Odisha. Shri Kar met Shri Biju Patnaik. Biju babu took a liking for him and Shri Kar remained his close confidant till Biju babu's death.

Shri Kar wrote four poetry books (Druta Bilambita, Manthan, Romanthan and Ananya), one long fiction (Samayara Jete Dheu), one spiritual book and hundreds of articles in newspapers and magazines on literary, social, spiritual and political topics in Odia. He was a prolific orator on politics and culture. A great devotee of Lord Jagannath, he gave commentary on the Lord's Car Festival ("Rath Yatra") on All India Radio, Doordarshan and private TV channels for the last 45 years.

His spouse, Smt. Anima Mishra Kar, is a retired Professor in English. She is an accomplished singer and was an "A" Grade artist for All India Radio, Cuttack through the 1960s to the 1990s. His elder son, Shri Suman Kar is a lecturer in English in Bhubaneswar. His younger son, Shri Sobhan Kar, is an Indian Revenue Service officer and works for the Government of India at New Delhi.

Shri Kar died on 12 October 2020, from COVID-19 during the COVID-19 pandemic in India, aged 81.

References

1939 births
2020 deaths
India MPs 1977–1979
Biju Janata Dal politicians
Deaths from the COVID-19 pandemic in India
Odisha MLAs 1971–1973
Odisha MLAs 1990–1995
Odisha MLAs 2000–2004
Speakers of the Odisha Legislative Assembly
Janata Party politicians
Janata Dal politicians
Utkal Congress politicians
People from Cuttack district
Indian National Congress politicians from Odisha
Lok Dal politicians